Deep Blue is a female great white shark that is estimated to be 6.1 m (20 ft) long and over fifty years old. The shark was first spotted in Mexico by researcher Mauricio Hoyos Padilla. Deep Blue was featured on the Discovery Channel's Shark Week. The shark was spotted by marine biologists studying tiger sharks near the island of Oahu, Hawaii. Various videos show the shark as calm and non-aggressive around humans and even dolphins.

Discovery
Deep Blue was first discovered in 2014 when she was filmed as part of Shark Week off the coast of Guadalupe Island, Mexico, aboard the MV Horizon charter vessel. Deep Blue's popularity increased when a viral video of her was posted to Facebook in 2015 by Padilla. Deep Blue's exposure increased further when she was spotted scavenging for food from a sperm whale carcass in Hawaii by researchers who had been in the area to monitor tiger sharks. Due to the amount of interest, a Twitter account about her was created.

Description
Deep Blue has noticeable pigmentation and markings on her body, with a large laceration over her right side. In addition to her length, her body has a noticeable girth to it, indicating she may have been pregnant. Deep Blue was identified by researchers by her size and the pattern of where the gray coloring meets the white underside. Shark photographer George Probst notes that a shark's countershade is unique to the individual of the species and is analogous to a human fingerprint.

Interactions with humans
Despite the large size of Deep Blue, she has been filmed non-aggressively approaching one diver and even tolerating the presence of other scuba divers in the area, even allowing free diver and model Ocean Ramsey, to hold on to one of her fins while swimming with her. However, multiple sources disputed that the shark encountered by Ramsey was Deep Blue and was more likely to be Haole Girl. Prior to this interaction, the shark is said to have already fed on some of the whale carcass, which may have contributed to her placid behavior around the divers. 
When Deep Blue was filmed in Mexico a few years before, she was seen calmly swimming around the shark cage and only taking curious bites at the cage; she did not attack Padillo, who had been on top of the cage and exposed. The diver was even able to touch her fin, stating he was trying to push her away from the cage.

Criticism and identity
Ramsey's video of her touching and holding onto the shark has brought on some criticism from shark researchers. David Shiffman, a marine biologist criticised Ramsey's behaviour and stated that the shark should not be interfered with, stating that it is an enormous wild predator and that repeated contact from humans can over stress the animal. Michael Domeier, another shark researcher, also criticised Ramsey's behaviour. Domeier stated that the number one rule of shark diving was not to touch the sharks. Both researchers considered Ramsey's behaviour as essentially harassing the animal.

In addition to his criticism of Ramsey, Domeier believed that the shark encountered by Ramsey was not Deep Blue and was likely to be Haole Girl, a newly discovered great white shark that Domeier believed was pregnant.

David Bernvi, a graduate student, has claimed that Deep Blue is with 93% likelihood 528 cm in total length (total length 491–565 cm) based on a model using the caudal fin to determine the total length. This means that Deep Blue likely is  5.3 m (17 ft) long and not the largest white shark on record.

References 

Sharks
Carcharodon
Individual wild animals